The 1920 College Football All-America team is composed of college football players who were selected as All-Americans by various organizations and writers that chose College Football All-America Teams in 1920. The four selectors recognized by the NCAA as "official" for the 1920 season are (1) Walter Camp (WC), whose selections were published in Collier's Weekly; (2) Football World magazine; (4) the International News Service, a news service operated by the Hearst newspapers; and (3) the Frank Menke syndicate (FM).   Additional notable selectors who chose All-American teams in 1920 included Walter Eckersall (WE) of the Chicago Tribune, the United Press (UP), and The New York Times (NYT).

Consensus All-Americans
For the year 1920, the NCAA recognizes four All-America selectors as "official" for purposes of its consensus determinations. The following chart identifies the NCAA-recognized consensus All-Americans and displays which official and other first-team designations they received.

All-Americans of 1920

Ends

Chuck Carney, Illinois (College Football Hall of Fame) (INS-2; WC-1; UP-1; WE-1; NEA-1; LP-1)
Bill Fincher, Georgia Tech (College Football Hall of Fame) (WC-1, LP-1 [as T])
Luke Urban, Boston College (FM; FW; WC-2; LP-1; NYT)
Armant Legendre, Princeton (FW; INS-1; WC-2; UP-3; WE-1; LP-2)
Eddie Anderson, Notre Dame (College Football Hall of Fame) (UP-1; NEA-2)
Frank Weston, Wisconsin (FM; INS-3; UP-2; WE-2; NEA-2; LP-2)
Harold Muller, California (WC-3; NEA-1)
Roger Kiley, Notre Dame (INS-1)
Bird Carroll, Washington & Jefferson (NYT)
Lester Belding, Iowa (WE-2; INS-2)
Eddie Ewen, Navy (WC-3)
Clarence Swanson, Nebraska (College Football Hall of Fame) (INS-3)
Cyril E. Myers, Ohio State (UP-3)

Tackles

Stan Keck, Princeton (College Football Hall of Fame) (FM; FW; WC-1; UP-1; WE-1; NEA-1; LP-1; INS-1; NYT)
Ralph Scott, Wisconsin (WC-1; NEA-2)
Bertrand Gulick, Syracuse (INS-1; UP-1; NYT)
Robert Minturn Sedgwick, Harvard (FW; INS-2)
Tillie Voss, Detroit (WC-3; WE-1)
Gus Sonnenberg, Dartmouth (WE-2; UP-3; NEA-1; LP-2)
Angus Goetz, Michigan (WC-2)
Dan McMillan, Cal (College Football Hall of Fame) (WC-2)
Frank Coughlin, Notre Dame (WE-2; INS-2)
Thomas V. Dickens, Yale (WC-3; UP-2; INS-3)
Roy Smoot, Oklahoma (NEA-2)
Tad Wieman, Michigan (LP-2)
Clyde W. King, Navy (UP-3; INS-3)
 Russ Stein, Washington & Jefferson (UP-2)

Guards

Tim Callahan, Yale (INS-1; WC-1; UP-1)
Tom Woods, Harvard (FW; INS-2; WC-1; UP-2; NEA-2; NYT)
Iolas Huffman, Ohio State (FM; LP-1)
Percy W. Griffiths, Penn State (FW; INS-1; UP-1; NEA-1; WE-2)
James Randolph Tolbert, Harvard (FM; NEA-1; WE-1)
Charles McGuire, Chicago (FM; INS-3)
John Acosta, Yale (NEA-2; UP-2; WE-1)
Harold Hess, Penn State (NYT)
Edward E. Wilkie, Navy (WC-2; UP-3)
Fritz Breidster, Army (WC-3; WE-2)
Dean Trott, Ohio State (WC-3)
Dummy Lebey, Georgia Tech (LP-2)
George Hartong, Chicago (LP-2)
John L. Taylor, Ohio State (INS-2)
Albert W. T. Mohr, Illinois (INS-3)

Centers

Herb Stein, Pittsburgh (College Football Hall of Fame) (FM; WC-1; WE-2)
Doc Alexander, Syracuse (FW; INS-1; WC-2 [g]; UP-1; NEA-2; NYT)
Polly Wallace, Ames (WE-1)
Jack Depler, Illinois (NEA-1)
Bill Cunningham, Dartmouth (WC-2; UP-2; INS-2)
Charles Frederick Havemeyer, Harvard (WC-3)
George Bunge, Wisconsin (LP-1; UP-3 [g])
Andy Nemecek, Ohio State (LP-2)
William Day, Nebraska (INS-3)
Jack Heaphy, Boston College (UP-3)

Quarterbacks

Donold Lourie, Princeton (College Football Hall of Fame) (INS-1; WC-1; UP-1; NEA-2; LP-1; NYT)
 Bo McMillin, Centre (College Football Hall of Fame) (FW; INS-3; WC-2; UP-2; WE-1; NEA-1; LP-2 [hb])
Benny Boynton, Williams (INS-2; FM; WC-3; WE-2; INS-2)
Hoge Workman, Ohio State (LP-2)
Aubrey Devine, Iowa (UP-3)

Halfbacks
Gaylord Stinchcomb, Ohio State (College Football Hall of Fame) (INS-2; FM; WC-1; WE-1; NEA-2; LP-1)
Charley Way, Penn State (WC-1; UP-1; INS-1)
Tom Davies, Pittsburgh (College Football Hall of Fame) (FM; FW; INS-2; WC-2; UP-1; WE-2; NYT)
Phil White, Oklahoma (NEA-1)
Hinkey Haines, Penn State (WC-3; WE-2; NEA-2)
Jimmy Leech, Virginia Military Institute (College Football Hall of Fame) (WC-3; UP-3)
George Owen, Harvard (INS-3)

Fullbacks
George Gipp, Notre Dame (College Football Hall of Fame) (FM; FW; INS-1 [hb]; WC-1; LP-1 [hb]; NEA-1 [hb]; UP-1; WE-1 [hb])
Arnold Horween, Harvard (INS-1; WC-3; LP-2; NEA-1; WE-1)
Walter French, Army (FW; INS-3; WC-2; UP-2; LP-2 [hb])
Hank Garrity, Princeton (WC-2 [hb]; UP-2; LP-1; NYT [hb])
Jim Robertson, Dartmouth (UP-2 [e]; NYT)
Jack Crangle, Illinois (UP-2; WE-2; NEA-2; INS-2)
Buck Flowers, Georgia Tech (UP-3 [hb]; INS-3)
Fred Strauss, Penn (UP-3)

Key
NCAA recognized selectors for 1920
 WC = Walter Camp
 FW = Football World magazine
 INS = International News Service, selected by Jake Velock
 FM = Frank Menke Syndicate, Frank G. Menke (sporting editor King Features Syndicate)

Other selectors
 UP = Henry L. Farrell, United Press Staff Correspondent
 WE = Walter Eckersall, of the Chicago Tribune
 NEA = Newspaper Association of America, by Dean Snyder
 LP = Lawrence Perry, "acknowledged authority on college sports," for the Consolidated Press
 NYT = The New York Times

Bold = Consensus All-American
 1 – First-team selection
 2 – Second-team selection
 3 – Third-team selection

See also
 1920 All-Big Ten Conference football team
 1920 All-Pacific Coast football team
 1920 All-Southern college football team
 1920 All-Western college football team

References

All-America Team
College Football All-America Teams